No Land's Man is a 2021 American-Bangladeshi-Indian drama film directed and written by Mostofa Sarwar Farooki. The film set on a journey of a South Asian man which becomes complicated when he meets an Australian woman in America. The plot of the film deals with the fascism and the identity crisis. It stars including Nawazuddin Siddiqui, Eisha Chopra, Tahsan Rahman Khan and others. The film, a joint production of United States, India, Australia and Bangladesh is produced by Mostofa Sarwar Farooki, Shrihari Sathe, Nawazuddin Siddiqui, Anjan Chowdhury, Faridur Reza Sagar and Nusrat Imrose Tisha. A.R. Rahman also joins the film as an executive producer and music composer..

It premiered in the "A Window on Asian Cinema" section at 26th Busan International Film Festival, which held from 6 to 15 October 2021.

Cast

Pre-production
In 2014, the film was awarded the Script Development Fund in the Motion Picture Association and Asia Pacific Screen Awards, while being a part of the Asian Project Market at Busan International Film Festival. It was also chosen as the best project at India’s Film Bazaar. The film shot in the different locations in the United States, Australia and India.

Release
No Land's Man will be premiered under the 'A Window on Asian Cinema' section at 26th Busan International Film Festival to be held from 6 to 15 October 2021. The film has also been nominated for 
Kim Jiseok award in Busan International Film Festival.

Nomination

References

External links

2020s English-language films
American drama films
Indian drama films
Bengali-language Bangladeshi films
Films based on American novels
Films shot in the United States
Films shot in Australia
Films shot in India
Films produced by Mostofa Sarwar Farooki
Films produced by Shrihari Sathe
Films directed by Mostofa Sarwar Farooki
Films scored by A. R. Rahman
2021 films
2021 drama films
2020s American films